Prionosoma is a genus of true bugs belonging to the family Pentatomidae.

The species of this genus are found in Northern America.

Species:
 Prionosoma podopioides Uhler, 1863

References

Pentatomidae
Pentatomomorpha genera